On Ning Garden is a Home Ownership Scheme and Private Sector Participation Scheme court in Hang Hau, Tseung Kwan O, New Territories, Hong Kong near MTR Hang Hau station. It was jointly developed by the Hong Kong Housing Authority and Hening Investment, and has a total of six blocks built on reclaimed land and was completed in 1991.

Houses

Demographics
According to the 2016 by-census, On Ning Garden had a population of 6,921. The median age was 49.2 and the majority of residents (96.7 per cent) were of Chinese ethnicity. The average household size was 3.2 people. The median monthly household income of all households (i.e. including both economically active and inactive households) was HK$41,900.

Politics
On Ning Garden is located in Nam On constituency of the Sai Kung District Council. It was formerly represented by Francis Chau Yin-ming, who was elected in the 2019 elections.

Covid Pandemic
Block 5 was sealed off on 25 February, 2022.

See also

Public housing estates in Tseung Kwan O

References

Residential buildings completed in 1991
Tseung Kwan O
Hang Hau
Home Ownership Scheme
Private Sector Participation Scheme
1991 establishments in Hong Kong
Housing estates with centralized LPG system in Hong Kong